Qaleh-ye Ali Mohammad (also Romanized as Qal‘eh-ye ‘Alī Moḩammad and Qal‘eh ‘Ali Muhammad; also known as ‘Alī Moḩammad and Kalāt-e ‘Alī Moḩammad) is a village in Qushkhaneh-ye Bala Rural District, Qushkhaneh District, Shirvan County, North Khorasan Province, Iran. At the 2006 census, its population was 460, in 104 families.

References 

Populated places in Shirvan County